You and Me was a children's television programme hosted by Australian-born New Zealand entertainer Suzy Cato. The first episode aired in 1992 and more than 2000 episodes were produced in the next seven years.

History 

From July 1992 until September 1993, Pauline Cooper was the presenter. In the late 2000s, the show returned to New Zealand television airing on TVNZ 6 and TVNZ Kidzone 24. Additionally there was a version made for international release featuring Cato, except with the Maori words removed.

References

External links

New Zealand children's television series
New Zealand television shows featuring puppetry
1992 New Zealand television series debuts
1998 New Zealand television series endings
Three (TV channel) original programming
Television shows set in New Zealand
Television shows funded by NZ on Air